William Morgan "Buddy" Lewis, Jr. (26 December 1906 – 8 December 1968) was a writer of jazz songs, some of which were also recorded in the pop music genre.

Lewis was born in Rockville, Connecticut and died in New York City.  He wrote songs and Broadway theatre scores with lyricist Nancy Hamilton including "How High the Moon" and "The Old Soft Shoe".

Selected work
Songs
 "At Last It's Love"
 "Cause You Won't Play House"
 "Fool for Luck"
 "A House with a Little Red Barn"
 "How High the Moon"
 "I Only Know"
 "If It's Love"
 "A Lovely, Lazy Kind of Day"	
 "Oh, You're a Wonderful Person"
 "The Old Soft Shoe"
 "Teeter Totter Tessie"
 "Two Can Dream the Same Dream"
 "The Yoo Hoo Blues"

Broadway theatre scores
 New Faces of 1934 (1934); music also by others
 One For the Money (1939)
 Two for the Show (1940)
 Three to Make Ready (1946)

Film scores
 The Unconquered (Helen Keller in Her Story), Documentary (1954)

References

External links

1906 births
1968 deaths
people from Rockville, Connecticut